The Islamic Broadcast Network is a local cable television station in Trinidad and Tobago. Known as the IBN, the station is carried on Channel 8 on the Columbus cable system. The station's studios are located at Bamboo Main Road in Valsayn, and its CEO is Tanvir kamal.

Programming
The station carries several hours of local programming daily. While it focuses on religious programming the station's schedule also includes a considerable amount of current affairs and community / lifestyle programming. Shows such as Breaking Barriers and Point Blank have become immensely popular and have been rated highly in recent surveys.

Controversy 
On 22 January 2007, Police Commissioner Trevor Paul claimed that members of the business community contacted him expressing anxiety about the CEO's public call for business to close on the 25th and 26th as a public protest to highlight the spiraling crime situation. Based on four complaints, the contents of which are yet to be made public, the Police Commissioner recommended that the Telecommunications Authority of Trinidad and Tobago (TATT) investigate the alleged conduct of the talk show host. Columbus Communications, the cable company on which IBN TV8 airs, said they have “no choice” but to pull the popular talk show Breaking Barriers off the air over complaints by TATT over “questionable content.” The show was hosted by Mr Inshan Ishmael.

External links
Facebook Page/Live Stream
Official Site  
Live Stream

Television stations in Trinidad and Tobago